The 1986–87 Combined Counties Football League season was the ninth in the history of the Combined Counties Football League, a football competition in England.

The league was won by Ash United for the second time, after they had won the Western Division in 1981–82 when the league was split into two divisions, and beaten Malden Town in a playoff.

League table

The league was reduced from 19 clubs to 18 after Chertsey Town were promoted to the Isthmian League and Fleet Town left the league. One new club joined:
Chipstead, joining from the Surrey Premier League.

References

External links
 Combined Counties League Official Site

1986-87
1986–87 in English football leagues